Ricky Ray Butler (born January 4, 1983) is a digital entertainment marketing and social media advertising professional. He is known for being one of the first to promote influencer marketing. He is the founder of Plaid Social Labs, CEO of Branded Entertainment Network (BEN) Group, member of Forbes Agency Council, and among the AdAge’s 40 Under 40.

He also co-hosts a podcast “Creative Disruption Podcast.”

Career 
In 2009, he founded Plaid Social Labs, a social media influencer marketing company, to connect advertisers with social media influencers. Through his platform, he worked with David Dobrik and MrBeast. He also worked with companies, including Orabrush and Will it Blend. He was referred to as YouTubers’ “favorite rich uncle” by Forbes.

In 2015, it was acquired by BEN Group, a Bill Gates company. Within one year of the acquisition, Bulter became the Global CCO and worked with Microsoft, Ubisoft, Disney, the Gap, Dyson, and General Motors. On June 1, 2018, he was appointed the company's CEO.

With AI Dungeon, he works on applications of natural language generation in gaming, and with Zeff, a subsidiary of DataRobot, he works to power automated machine learning using unstructured data.

He is a contributor at AdAge, Adweek, The Drum, and Campaign.

Recognition 
Butler is one of AdAge’s 40 Under 40 and among the Top 50 Persons in influencer marketing of Influence Directory. He was also featured in Derral Eves’s The YouTube Formula: How Anyone Can Unlock the Algorithm to Drive Views.

References 

1983 births
Living people
Marketing people
American marketing people
American businesspeople